Uppli is a village located within the Sangrur district of Punjab, India.

References

Barnala
Villages in Barnala district